Jay Eye See was a harness racer who is known for breaking the trotting record in 1884, and for breaking the pacing record in 1892. Jay Eye See was owned by manufacturer Jerome Case, who named the Case Jay-Eye-See Brougham automobile after him.

Racing career 
Jay Eye See's name (also spelled "Jay-Eye-See") was a pun on the initials of his owner, threshing machine manufacturer Jerome Case. Harness racing was the sport of choice among the wealthy in the 1880s, and Jay Eye See was Mr. Case's favorite horse.

The black gelding, foaled in 1878, broke the mile trotting record of 2:10 at Narragansett Park in 1884.
After winning many other races, the horse was injured and retired in August 1889.

However, Jay-Eye-See was retrained by Edwin D. Blither to race with a new gait, and three years later set a pacing record of 2:06.25 in 1892 at Independence, Iowa. Both records were quickly broken; the trotting mark on the next day, and the pacing mark in a subsequent heat of the same race.
However, the feat of two records was unique enough that the horse became a celebrity. Currier and Ives did a series of prints and the horse's image was used to advertise products by the Case company for years.
The horse outlived Case and died in 1909 at the age of 31.
The horse "known the country over" had its obituary printed in national newspapers such as the New York Times.
Jay-Eye-See was inducted into the Harness Racing Hall of Fame in 1990
and the Wisconsin Harness Racing Hall of Fame in 1996.

References

External links 
Hervey, John. "Jay-Eye-See; First 2:10 Mile." Harness Horse, January 26, 1938.

American Standardbred racehorses
1878 racehorse births
1909 racehorse deaths
Racehorses bred in the United States
Racine, Wisconsin
United States Harness Racing Hall of Fame inductees